Arianna Valloni (born 10 April 2001) is a Sammarinese swimmer.

In 2018, she finished in 22nd place in the heats in the girls' 400 metre freestyle at the 2018 Summer Youth Olympics held in Buenos Aires, Argentina. She also competed in the girls' 800 metre freestyle where she finished in 15th place.

In 2019, she won the silver medal in the women's 800 metre freestyle at the 2019 Games of the Small States of Europe held in Budva, Montenegro. In 2019, she represented San Marino at the 2019 World Aquatics Championships held in Gwangju, South Korea. She competed in the women's 800 metre freestyle and women's 1500 metre freestyle events. In both events she did not advance to compete in the final.

At the 2020 European Aquatics Championships held in Budapest, Hungary, she competed in the women's 800 metre freestyle and women's 1500 metre freestyle events.

In 2021, she represented San Marino at the 2020 Summer Olympics held in Tokyo, Japan. She competed in the women's 800 metre freestyle and women's 1500 metre freestyle events. She was also one of the flagbearers for San Marino during the 2020 Summer Olympics Parade of Nations as part of the opening ceremony on 23 July 2021, along with wrestler Myles Amine.

References 

Living people
2001 births
Place of birth missing (living people)
Sammarinese female swimmers
Sammarinese female freestyle swimmers
Swimmers at the 2018 Summer Youth Olympics
Olympic swimmers of San Marino
Swimmers at the 2020 Summer Olympics